Theresa Jimmie Francine Knorr (née Cross; born March 14, 1946) is an American woman convicted of torturing and murdering two of her six children while using the others to facilitate and cover up her crimes. She was acquitted of murdering her first husband. She is currently serving two consecutive life sentences at the California Institution for Women in Chino, California.

Early life
Theresa Knorr was born in Sacramento, California, the younger of two daughters born to Swannie Gay (née Myers) and James "Jim" Cross. Theresa's mother had a son and a daughter from a previous marriage. Her father worked as an assistant cheese maker at a local dairy, eventually saving up enough money to buy a house in Rio Linda.

In the late 1950s, Jim Cross was diagnosed with Parkinson's disease, which forced him to quit his job. He developed depression and reportedly took his frustrations and anger out on his family. Swannie Cross kept the family afloat financially.

Theresa was reportedly very close to her mother and was devastated when she died of congestive heart failure in March 1961. Thereafter, unable to keep the family home, her father sold it.

Marriages
On September 29, 1962, 16-year-old Theresa married Clifford Clyde Sanders, a man five years her senior whom she had met a few months prior. She immediately dropped out of high school and became pregnant, and on July 16, 1963, gave birth to her first child, Howard Clyde Sanders.

The marriage was rocky as Theresa was possessive and repeatedly accused Sanders of infidelity. The couple argued frequently and on June 22, 1964, Theresa claimed Sanders had punched her in the face during one such argument. She reported the incident to police but refused to press charges against Sanders. The assault charges were subsequently dropped.

On July 6, 1964, the day after Sanders' birthday, the couple were arguing because he had spent his birthday out with friends instead of at home. During the argument, Sanders informed Theresa that he was leaving her. Theresa became enraged and shot Sanders in the back with a rifle as he was walking out the door.

Theresa was arrested and charged with Sanders' murder, to which she pleaded not guilty claiming she was acting in self-defense. During her trial, Theresa, who was pregnant with her second child, claimed that she had shot Sanders because he was a violent alcoholic who had physically abused her. Several of Sanders' relatives testified that he was neither violent nor abusive, while the prosecution claimed that Theresa killed Sanders "maliciously" and "without provocation."

Theresa's older sister testified against her, stating that Theresa was possessive and jealous and "would kill [Sanders] before any other woman could have him."

Theresa was acquitted of Sanders' murder on September 22, 1964. She gave birth to her second child, Sheila Gay Sanders, on March 16, 1965.

After Sheila's birth, Theresa began drinking heavily. She regularly drank at the local American Legion hall where she met Estell L. Thornsberry, a disabled United States Army veteran. The two began a relationship and eventually moved in together. During the relationship, Theresa would routinely leave her children with Thornsberry while she went out drinking. Thornsberry began to question Theresa when she stayed out for days at a time and ended the relationship a few months later after he discovered that she was having an affair with his best friend. Shortly after the relationship with Thornsberry ended, she met and began a relationship with a United States Marine Corps private named Robert Knorr. She soon became pregnant and the couple married on July 9, 1966.

Theresa's third child, Suesan Marline Knorr, was born on September 27, 1966. The couple had three more children: William Robert Knorr on September 15, 1967; Robert Wallace Knorr, Jr. on December 31, 1968; and Theresa "Terry" Marie Knorr on August 5, 1970. However, Theresa's marriage to Robert began to deteriorate after she began accusing her husband of having affairs. Both spouses were known to be volatile and would constantly beat each other and the kids. Fed up with his wife's constant accusations, Robert left her in December 1970 and was granted a divorce in 1971. After the divorce, Robert attempted to see his children but Theresa prevented him from doing so.

Theresa would marry twice more; in 1971, she married railroad worker Ronald Pulliam. That marriage began to fall apart when Theresa began leaving her children with Pulliam while she stayed out all night drinking and partying. He divorced her in 1972 after he became convinced that she was having an affair.

Her final marriage was to Sacramento Union copy editor Chester "Chet" Harris, whom she married in August 1976. Theresa's daughter Suesan grew close to Harris, which made Theresa jealous. She filed for divorce from Harris in November 1976 after she reportedly found out that Harris enjoyed taking consensual nude photographs of women.

Child abuse
Theresa Knorr was physically, verbally, and psychologically abusive toward her children, behavior which escalated after her fourth divorce. She also gained a tremendous amount of weight, and became reclusive to the point of disconnecting the home phone and refusing to allow the children to have visitors. Knorr and her children lived in Orangevale, California, for many years before moving into a two-bedroom apartment in Sacramento; her eldest son Howard reportedly left home before the move to Sacramento. According to neighbors, the Sacramento apartment was filthy and smelled of urine. Neighbors also noticed that the children, whom Knorr never let go outside, seemed fearful, nervous and high-strung.

For years, Knorr abused and tortured her children in various ways, including beating them, force-feeding them, burning them with cigarettes, and throwing knives at them. She made her children hold each other down while she assaulted them. In one instance, Knorr held a pistol to her youngest daughter Terry's head and threatened to kill her. Knorr primarily focused her anger and abuse on Terry's older sisters, Suesan and Sheila. In an interview, Terry said her mother resented that Suesan and Sheila were maturing and blossoming into attractive young women while she faced the prospect of losing her looks as she aged.

Knorr also believed that her fourth husband, Chet Harris, had turned Suesan into a witch, so Suesan received the worst of Knorr's abuse. After one severe beating, Suesan ran away from home. She was picked up by police and placed in a psychiatric hospital where she told staff that her mother abused her. Knorr denied the abuse claims and told the hospital staff that Suesan had mental issues. Authorities did not investigate the matter further and released Suesan back into her mother's custody. Knorr immediately punished Suesan by beating her while wearing a pair of leather gloves, and forced Susesan's siblings to take turns in the assault. In the subsequent weeks, Knorr handcuffed Suesan to the kitchen table and ordered her other children to stand watch over her. She refused to let Suesan leave the house and forced her to drop out of school. Knorr also pulled her other children out of school, and most of them never advanced past the eighth grade.

Suesan's death
For two years, Knorr handcuffed Suesan under the dining room table making her suffer. Knorr would hand feed her from time to time, but she had to have a mouth gag on. Suesan couldn't take the torture anymore and begged her mom to let her go.
The next morning, Knorr went on a psychotic rampage and started hitting all of her children. She uncuffed Suesan for a minute, but handed her youngest child Terry a gun to point at Suesan to make sure she didn't go anywhere. Meanwhile, while Knorr and the other children were in the kitchen making oatmeal, one of her children dropped the spoon and it spooked Terry, so the gun went off and hit Suesan. Knorr immediately chained her back under the dining room table, despite the fact she was bleeding out (while also getting upset that there was blood on her carpet), while Suesan begged her mom to take her to the hospital. Eventually, Knorr decided to nurse her back to health and made the other kids help. Suesan survived the shooting but attempts by Robert, at Knorr's request, to remove the bullet led to infection and sepsis.

On July 16, 1984, Knorr packed all of Suesan's belongings in trash bags and, after binding her arms and legs and placing duct tape over her mouth, ordered her sons Robert and William to put Suesan in their car. They drove her to Squaw Valley, where Robert and William placed her on the side of the road on top of the bags containing her belongings. Knorr then doused Suesan, who was still alive, and the bags in gasoline and lit them on fire. Suesan's still smoldering body was found the following day. Due to the state of the remains, a positive identification was never made and Suesan was classified as homicide case Jane Doe #4873/84.

Sheila's death
Following Suesan's death, Knorr began directing the majority of her anger and abuse towards her daughter Sheila, forcing the girl into prostitution in May 1985 to support the family. Knorr did not work and received unemployment benefits from the state of California. Knorr was initially pleased with this arrangement due to the large amounts of money Sheila was earning, and allowed Sheila to leave the house whenever she pleased.

However, after a few weeks, Knorr became angry and accused Sheila of being pregnant and contracting a sexually transmitted disease, which Knorr claimed she caught from Sheila via a toilet seat. When Sheila denied the accusations, Knorr beat her, hog tied her and locked her in a hot closet with no ventilation. Knorr forbade her other children from giving Sheila food or water or to open the door to the closet. Terry disobeyed her mother and gave Sheila a beer. Terry later said, "She [Theresa] wanted Sheila to confess. That was Mother's way: beat them until they confess." To end the punishment, Sheila confessed to being pregnant and having an STD, but Knorr claimed that she was lying and refused to let her out of the closet. Sheila died three days later, on June 21, 1985, of dehydration and starvation.

Knorr left Sheila's body in the closet for an additional three days before discovering that she was dead. Once again, Knorr ordered her sons William and Robert to dispose of Sheila's body, which had begun to decompose and was causing an odorous smell that filled the apartment. The boys placed Sheila's body in a cardboard box which they disposed of near Truckee-Tahoe Airport. Sheila's body was discovered a few hours after it had been disposed of but was never positively identified and was classified as Jane Doe #6607-85.

Even though Sheila's body had been removed from the closet, the smell of decomposition still lingered in the apartment. Knorr became concerned that the smell and physical evidence in the closet could implicate her in Sheila's death. On September 29, 1986, Knorr moved the family's belongings out of the home and ordered Terry to burn down the apartment in an effort to destroy any physical evidence. During the night, Terry dumped three containers of lighter fluid on the apartment floor and set it on fire. However, the fire did little damage as neighbors quickly reported the fire before it spread. The closet in which Sheila died was not damaged. After Knorr's arrest, investigators were able to remove the subfloor from the closet to test it for physical evidence.

After leaving the Sacramento apartment, Knorr went into hiding. Her surviving children, who were by then of legal age, severed their ties with their mother. Her youngest child, 16-year-old Terry, also escaped her mother's care and used Sheila's identification card to pass herself off as a legal adult. The only child to remain with Knorr was Robert, Jr. who was then 19 years old. Knorr and Robert, Jr. moved to Las Vegas, Nevada, and attempted to keep a low profile. In November 1991, Robert Knorr, Jr. was arrested after he fatally shot a bartender in a Las Vegas bar during an attempted robbery. He was sentenced to sixteen years in prison. Shortly after Robert, Jr.'s arrest, Knorr left Las Vegas and relocated to Salt Lake City, Utah.

Arrests and convictions
After escaping from her mother, Terry attempted to report her sisters' murders to the Utah police; they dismissed her stories as fiction, as did a therapist she visited.

On October 28, 1993, Terry phoned the hotline for the Fox television program America's Most Wanted, and was told to contact detectives in Placer County, California, where Suesan's body had been found. Placer County detectives took her claims seriously and followed up with an investigation, soon linking the two Jane Does found in the area in 1984 and 1985 to Terry's detailed stories of her sisters' deaths. William Knorr  was arrested on November 4, 1993, in Woodland, California, where he had been living and working.

Robert Knorr, Jr. was charged with his sisters' murders while he was serving his sixteen-year sentence in an Ely, Nevada, prison. On November 10, 1993, Knorr herself was arrested at her home in Salt Lake City. At the time of her arrest, she was using her maiden name of "Cross" and was working as a caretaker for her landlord's 86-year-old mother.

On November 15, 1993, Theresa Knorr was charged with two counts of murder, two counts of conspiracy to commit murder, and two special circumstances charges: multiple murder and murder by torture. Knorr initially pleaded not guilty, but then made a deal with the prosecution after learning that her son Robert Jr. had agreed to testify against her in exchange for a reduced sentence. She pleaded guilty on the condition that she be spared the death penalty. On October 17, 1995, Knorr was sentenced to two consecutive life sentences. She is incarcerated at California Institution for Women in Chino, California. Knorr had a parole hearing in July 2019, but was denied release. Her next parole hearing will be in July 2024.

William Knorr was sentenced to probation and ordered to undergo therapy for participating in his sister Suesan's murder. In exchange for his testimony, the prosecution dropped all charges against Robert Knorr, Jr. save for one count of being an accessory-after-the-fact in relation to Sheila's murder. Robert Jr. pleaded guilty to the charge and was sentenced to three years in prison, which was served concurrently with his sixteen-year sentence in Nevada.

Aftermath
Following Knorr's arrest, police decided to reopen the murder case of Theresa's sister, Rosemary Knorr Norris. Norris was found strangled to death at the end of a dead-end road in Placer County in 1983 after she went grocery shopping in Sacramento. Police later determined that Knorr was not involved in Norris' death. 
 
After running away from her mother's home, Terry Knorr married twice and eventually moved to Sandy, Utah, where she lived with her second husband. She worked as a grocery store cashier in the same neighborhood where her mother had also lived and worked before her arrest. Theresa and Terry apparently did not know they lived in close proximity and had no contact. Terry Knorr died in 2011, aged 41.

In popular culture
The 2010 horror film The Afflicted (also titled Another American Crime) is loosely based on the Theresa Knorr case. The film follows the real-life events through a substantially-compressed timeline. Unlike the real case, the movie ends with the youngest daughter killing her mother and one of her brothers before committing suicide.

The murders were profiled on the A&E series Cold Case Files, featuring an exclusive interview with Terry Knorr Walker. The case was also profiled on the series Most Evil, Wicked Attraction, Evil Lives Here, and Deadly Women.

References

Further reading 

1946 births
20th-century American criminals
American female criminals
American female murderers
American murderers of children
American people convicted of murder
American prisoners sentenced to life imprisonment
Filicides in California
Living people
Mariticides
People convicted of murder by California
People from Sacramento, California
People from Sacramento County, California
People with schizophrenia
Prisoners sentenced to life imprisonment by California
Suspected serial killers
Torture in the United States